Paludicola psychrotolerans is a bacterium of the monotypic genus Paludicola in the family Oscillospiraceae.

References

Taxa described in 2017

Bacteria described in 2017
Oscillospiraceae